This is a complete list of ice hockey players who were drafted in the National Hockey League Entry Draft by the Seattle Kraken franchise. It includes every player who was drafted, regardless of whether they played for the team. The Seattle Kraken franchise was founded as an expansion team in Seattle, Washington in 2021.

The NHL Entry Draft is held each June, allowing teams to select players who have turned 18 years old by September 15 in the year the draft is held. The draft order is determined by the previous season's order of finish, with non-playoff teams drafting first, followed by the teams that made the playoffs, with the specific order determined by the number of points earned by each team. The NHL holds a weighted lottery for the 16 non-playoff teams, allowing the winner to move up to the first overall pick. The team with the fewest points has the best chance of winning the lottery, with each successive team given a lower chance of moving up in the draft. Seattle's first draft pick was Matty Beniers, taken second overall in the 2021 NHL Entry Draft.

Key
 Played at least one game with the Kraken.
 Spent entire NHL career with the Kraken.

Draft picks

References
General
 
 
Specific

draft
 
Seattle Kraken